Umpqua County was a county located in the U.S. state of Oregon. It was created on January 24, 1851, by the Oregon Territorial Legislature embracing the lands along the Umpqua River in southwestern Oregon. Gold had been discovered in the Umpqua region, which brought a rapid increase of settlers to the new county. The first meeting of the Umpqua County Court was in Elkton in 1852; later the county government was moved to Green Valley and Yoncalla.

On January 7, 1852, the territorial legislature created Douglas County from the eastern part of Umpqua County. On December 22, 1853, part of the western portion of the county was included in the newly formed Coos County. Finally, on October 16, 1862, the remainder of Umpqua county was incorporated into Douglas County.

Some accounts state this was because of decreased population following the end of the local gold rush; other accounts state that politics caused the county's end.

See also 

 List of former United States counties
 List of counties in Oregon

References

External links
Hand-Book Almanac for the Pacific States
Douglas County History from the Oregon Historical County Records Guide

Former counties of the United States
Douglas County, Oregon
History of Oregon
Lane County, Oregon
1851 establishments in Oregon Territory
1862 disestablishments in Oregon
Populated places established in 1851
Populated places disestablished in 1862